Medicine Hat was a provincial electoral district in Alberta, Canada, mandated to return members to the Legislative Assembly of Alberta from 1905 to 1971, and again from 1979 to 2019. The electoral district was named after the City of Medicine Hat.

History
The electoral district of Medicine Hat has existed in two iterations. The Medicine Hat electoral district was one of the original 25 electoral districts contested in the 1905 Alberta general election upon Alberta joining Confederation in September 1905. The district was carried over from the old Medicine Hat electoral district which returned a single member to the Legislative Assembly of the Northwest Territories from 1888 to 1905. The member for the Northwest Territories seat, William Finlay would be elected in the 1st Alberta general election. Upon the electoral district's formation, it covered a large portion of rural south east Alberta. The district shrunk until it became an urban only riding surrounding the City of Medicine Hat.

The district was abolished in the 1971 electoral district re-distribution to become part of Medicine Hat-Redcliff, which was abolished in 1979 and once again became the Medicine Hat electoral district.

Under the 2004 Alberta electoral boundary re-distribution, the constituency covered the portion of the city north of the South Saskatchewan River, the Trans-Canada Highway and Carry Drive. The rest of the city and surrounding area was part of the Cypress-Medicine Hat constituency.

The 2010 electoral boundary re-distribution saw minor changes made to align the riding with new boundaries of Medicine Hat.

The Medicine Hat electoral district was dissolved in the 2017 electoral boundary re-distribution, and portions of the district would incorporate the Brooks-Medicine Hat to the North, and Cypress-Medicine Hat to the South for the 2019 Alberta general election.

Boundary history

Representation history

The provincial electoral district of Medicine Hat has a long history that goes back to 1888 under the old Medicine Hat, Northwest Territories electoral district. The district was carried over when the province of Alberta was created in 1905.

The first election in 1905 saw former Northwest Territories MLA William Finlay win the district in a hotly contested race. Finlay was re-elected in 1909 and resigned in 1910 so cabinet minister Charles Mitchell could have a seat in the Legislature.

Mitchell only held the district for one term before being defeated by Conservative Nelson Spencer in the 1913 election. Spencer's win was considered an upset. Spencer was re-elected by acclamation under Chapter 38 of the Elections Act in 1917 for serving in the Canadian Army during World War I. He retired from the Legislature in 1921 and moved to British Columbia.

The Liberal government passed a law in 1921 that turned Medicine Hat into a two-member constituency during the 5th Legislature. The two seats were won by United Farmers candidate Peren Baker who headed the polls and William Johnston a Dominion Labor candidate who finished second. Baker was confirmed to a cabinet post by acclamation in a ministerial by-election on December 9, 1921.

Johnson died in 1925, vacating his seat. The by-election saw former Speaker of the Legislature Charles Pingle win the district for the Liberal party.

The district was once again mandated to return two members in 1926, but this time electing through STV. Pingle stood for re-election. Baker moved to the Cypress electoral district. Liberal Pingle and Conservative J.J. Hendricks were elected in this election. This was the first - and only- election held in this district using single transferable vote. The vote was changed to Instant runoff voting before the next general election.

Pingle died in 1928, forcing another by-election. Liberal candidate Hector Lang retained the seat for the party. He was re-elected in 1930 and was defeated, when he ran for a third term in 1935, by Social Credit candidate John Robinson.

Robinson held the district for five terms, being re-elected in 1940, 1944, 1948 and 1952. He was appointed Minister of Industries and Labour by Premier Ernest Manning in 1948 and held that post until his death in 1953.

The by-election in 1953 saw John Robinson's wife Elizabeth Robinson retain the seat for Social Credit. She held the district for three terms before dying in 1961.

The last by-election held in the district in 1961 saw Harry Leinweber become the third member of Social Credit to win the district. He was re-elected in 1963 and 1967 before retiring in 1971.

Medicine Hat was redistributed to include the town of Redcliff in 1971 boundary redistribution. The new riding was called Medicine Hat-Redcliff. The electoral district of Medicine Hat was re-created in 1979 containing just the city of Medicine Hat.

The first election in the new Medicine Hat district saw former Medicine Hat-Redcliff incumbent Jim Horsman won the district in a landslide winning a 10,000 vote margin over the second place candidate. He would improve on that victory winning his biggest margin in the 1982 general election finishing almost 12,000 votes ahead of second place. He was also re-elected in 1986 and 1989 before retiring in 1993.

Rob Renner was elected as a Progressive Conservative candidate for the first time in the 1993 general election. He was re-elected in 1997, 2001, 2004 and 2008.

Blake Pedersen was elected as a Wildrose candidate in 2012.  On December 17, 2014, he was one of nine Wildrose MLAs who crossed the floor to join the Alberta Progressive Conservative caucus.

Bob Wanner was elected as a New Democratic Party (NDP) candidate in 2015.

Legislature results 1905-1971

1905 general election

1909 general election

1910 by-election

1913 general election

1917 general election

1921 general election

1921 by-election results

Due to laws existing in the Legislative Assembly Act a series of ministerial by-elections were needed to confirm members appointed to the Greenfield government. Seven by-elections in total were called for an election day of December 9, 1921. This was set for one week after the 1921 Canadian federal election.

The by-election writ was dropped on November 16, 1921, United Farmers incumbent Perren Baker who had been appointed as Minister of Education ran unopposed and was acclaimed at the nomination deadline held on December 2, 1921. The timing of the by-elections was deliberately chosen to coincide with the federal election to ensure that opposition candidates would be unlikely to oppose the cabinet ministers.

1925 by-election

William McCombs was a candidate jointly nominated by the United Farmers of Alberta and the Dominion Labor Party. The party percent change is reflected from the combined party percentages in the 1921 general election.

1926 general election
Two Members elected through STV.
Pingle and Hendricks both elected.

1928 by-election

1930 general election

1935 general election

1940 general election

1944 general election

1948 general election

1952 general election

1953 by-election

1955 general election

1959 general election

1961 by-election

1963 general election

1967 general election

Legislature results 1979-2015

1979 general election

1982 general election

1986 general election

1989 general election

1993 general election

1997 general election

2001 general election

2004 general election

2008 general election

2012 general election

2015 general election

Senate nominee results

2004 Senate nominee election district results
Voters had the option of selecting 4 Candidates on the Ballot

2012 Senate nominee election district results

Plebiscite results

1948 Electrification Plebiscite
District results from the first province wide plebiscite on electricity regulation.

1957 liquor plebiscite

On October 30, 1957 a stand-alone plebiscite was held province wide in all 50 of the then current provincial electoral districts in Alberta. The government decided to consult Alberta voters to decide on liquor sales and mixed drinking after a divisive debate in the Legislature. The plebiscite was intended to deal with the growing demand for reforming antiquated liquor control laws.

The plebiscite was conducted in two parts. Question A asked in all districts, asked the voters if the sale of liquor should be expanded in Alberta, while Question B asked in a handful of districts within the corporate limits of Calgary and Edmonton asked if men and woman were allowed to drink together in establishments.

Province wide Question A of the plebiscite passed in 33 of the 50 districts while Question B passed in all five districts. Medicine Hat just barely voted in favour of the proposal with the difference between Yes and No being four votes. Voter turnout in the district was slightly below the province wide average of 46%.

Official district returns were released to the public on December 31, 1957. The Social Credit government in power at the time did not considered the results binding. However the results of the vote led the government to repeal all existing liquor legislation and introduce an entirely new Liquor Act.

Municipal districts lying inside electoral districts that voted against the Plebiscite were designated Local Option Zones by the Alberta Liquor Control Board and considered effective dry zones, business owners that wanted a license had to petition for a binding municipal plebiscite in order to be granted a license.

Student Vote results

2004 election

On November 19, 2004 a Student Vote was conducted at participating Alberta schools to parallel the 2004 Alberta general election results. The vote was designed to educate students and simulate the electoral process for persons who have not yet reached the legal majority. The vote was conducted in 80 of the 83 provincial electoral districts with students voting for actual election candidates. Schools with a large student body that reside in another electoral district had the option to vote for candidates outside of the electoral district then where they were physically located.

2012 election

See also
List of Alberta provincial electoral districts
Medicine Hat a city in Alberta, Canada.
Medicine Hat (federal electoral district), a federal electoral district since 1908
Medicine Hat (N.W.T. electoral district), a territorial electoral district from 1888 to 1905

References

Further reading

External links
Elections Alberta
The Legislative Assembly of Alberta

Former provincial electoral districts of Alberta
Politics of Medicine Hat